Lamping, or Spotlighting, is a method of hunting nocturnal animals with high-powered lights.

Lamping may also refer to:

John Lamping, an American politician 
Mark Lamping, an American sports executive
 Lamping Peak, in Antarctica

See also
Lamp (disambiguation)